James Langstaff may refer to:

 James Langstaff (politician) (1825–1889), reeve of Richmond Hill, Ontario
 James Langstaff (bishop) (born 1956), Bishop of Rochester

See also 
 Langstaff (disambiguation)